Phelan, California, a US unincorporated town
Phelan (surname), people with the surname Phelan